Paulo César Vaz Mendes (born ), known as Pauleta, is a Portuguese professional futsal player who plays for Sporting CP and the Portugal national team as a winger.

Honour

International
Portugal
FIFA Futsal World Cup: 2021
UEFA Futsal Championship: 2022

References

External links

1994 births
Living people
Sportspeople from Cascais
Futsal forwards
Portuguese men's futsal players
C.F. Os Belenenses futsal players
Sporting CP futsal players